Carlton-Browne of the F.O. (U.S. title: Man in a Cocked Hat) is a 1959 British comedy film made by the Boulting Brothers and starring Terry-Thomas, Peter Sellers, and Luciana Paluzzi. It centres on an inept Foreign Office (F.O.) diplomat who is sent to re-establish good relations with the island of Gaillardia, an obscure former British colony that attracts the attention of both the UK and the USSR for its mineral deposits.

Plot
A title sequence prologue details Britain's accidental acquisition of the island of Gaillardia (located somewhere on the 33rd parallel south) during the 18th century, the feud between the two halves of the island and Britain's granting Gaillardia self-rule in 1916. When independence was granted, the Foreign Office (F.O.) failed to notify its representative, who was still there forty years later. He writes a letter to the F.O. informing them of suspicious Russian activity.

After some research, the F.O. decide the matter falls under the responsibility of Carlton-Browne, head of the Department of Miscellaneous Territories. Brutally inept, he had only gained the position due to the distinguished career of his father. He suggests sending out two British geologists under the cover of a British Council Morris dancing troupe putting on a show for the king of Gaillardia. At the show, the king is assassinated and his young Oxford-educated son Loris flies out to accede to the throne. On the flight, travelling incognito as 'Mr Jones', he talks to a beautiful young woman who happens to be from Gaillardia. Carlton-Browne is sent out to see to British interests under the new king, accompanied by his military attaché Colonel Bellingham of the Bays.

Loris and his prime minister Amphibulos stall the British, hoping to start a bidding war between them and the Russians for the country's mineral wealth. Amphibulos hopes to get rich, but Loris hopes to modernise his country and benefit its people. The two are then visited by Loris's uncle Grand Duke Alexis and the veiled Princess Ilyena, whom Alexis and his rebels are backing as the true claimant to the throne.

To settle the struggle between Loris and Alexis, the British persuade the United Nations to partition the island (to save costs, this is accomplished by little more than painting a white line across the island with a cricket pitch marking trolley). Soon afterwards, the British mineralogists arrive back at the F.O. to announce they have discovered rich cobalt deposits, on what is now Alexis's half of the island. Loris comes to Britain for talks, but the F.O. refuse to meet him, instead negotiating with Alexis so Britain can seize the mineral wealth. Loris discovers this and also overhears Amphibulos giving Alexis his support and planning to overthrow Loris in favour of Ilyena.

Disgusted, Loris leaves his hotel and meets Ilyena, who is attempting to avoid an unintelligent British suitor Carlton-Browne has set up for her. Loris recognises her as the young woman from the plane but only discovers her true identity when they duck into a cinema and see a newsreel of her arrival in Britain. Initially angry that she has hidden her identity from him, he soon falls in love with her and starts to discuss with her how to outwit both Amphibulos and Alexis. The F.O. receive news of a revolution in Gaillardia, withdraw their support for the partition and send Bellingham at the head of a party of parachutists to put down the revolution.

After the parachutists mistakenly attack their own HQ, Bellingham and Carlton-Browne are captured and taken to see the leaders of the revolution, Loris and Ilyena, now engaged to be married. Loris pretends that Carlton-Browne is not in Gaillardia to intervene in the revolution, but to give his congratulations on the engagement, which Carlton-Browne goes along with. Gaillardia is reunited, the Russians, British and Americans leave and Carlton-Browne is granted orders of chivalry by both Gaillardia and Britain for his services to world peace. The credits roll on a scene of a team of workmen painting out the white line.

Cast
Terry-Thomas as Cadogan De Vere Carlton-Browne
Peter Sellers as Prime Minister Amphibulos
Luciana Paluzzi as Princess Ilyena
Ian Bannen as the young King Loris
Thorley Walters as Colonel Bellingham
Raymond Huntley as Tufton-Slade, foreign secretary
Miles Malleson as Davidson, Resident Advisor 
John Le Mesurier as the Grand Duke
Marie Lohr as Lady Carlton-Browne
Kynaston Reeves as Sir Arthur Carlton-Browne 
Ronald Adam as Sir John Farthing
John Van Eyssen as Hewitt 
Nicholas Parsons as Rodgers 
Irene Handl as Mrs. Carter 
Harry Locke as Gaillardian commentator 
Basil Dignam as Security Officer 
Sam Kydd as Signaller 
Robert Bruce as Major Miller 
John Glyn-Jones as Newsreel Interviewer 
Marianne Stone as Woman in Cinema 
Kathryn Keeton as Dancer 
Margaret Lacey as Onlooker

Production
Filming started 28 April 1958.

See also
Gaillardia, a relative of the sunflower

References

External links

1959 films
1959 comedy films
1950s English-language films
British black-and-white films
British comedy films
Films directed by Roy Boulting
Films directed by Jeffrey Dell
Films scored by John Addison
Films set in the Caribbean
Films set on islands
1950s British films